Aissa Moukrim (born 8 February 1964) is a Moroccan boxer. He competed in the men's flyweight event at the 1988 Summer Olympics.

References

External links
 

1964 births
Living people
Moroccan male boxers
Olympic boxers of Morocco
Boxers at the 1988 Summer Olympics
Place of birth missing (living people)
Flyweight boxers